John F. Laudadio, Sr. (December 26, 1916 – June 6, 1977) was a Democratic member of the Pennsylvania House of Representatives.

References

Democratic Party members of the Pennsylvania House of Representatives
1977 deaths
1916 births
20th-century American politicians